The Women's 100m T12 had its first round held on September 8, beginning at 11:17. The Semifinals were held on September 8, at 18:15 and the A and B Finals were held on September 9 at 11:25.

Medalists

Results

References
Round 1 - Heat 1
Round 1 - Heat 2
Round 1 - Heat 3
Round 1 - Heat 4
Round 1 - Heat 5
Semifinals - Heat 1
Semifinals - Heat 2
Semifinals - Heat 3
Final A
Final B

Athletics at the 2008 Summer Paralympics
2008 in women's athletics